The rape of Fano (also outrage of Fano) is an alleged scandal that would have taken place on 26 or 27 May 1537 in the eponymous city (Papal States), involving the warlord Pier Luigi Farnese who raped the Bishop of the city, Cosimo Gheri, during an inspection of the Marche fortresses. Its historical veracity is matter of debate. The event is recorded by the Florentine historian Benedetto Varchi in the 16th book of his Storia fiorentina (first published in 1721). Nevertheless, a letter by Pietro Bembo, dated 5 January 1538, seems to confirm Varchi's account.

History

Incident 
The office of Gonfalonier of the Church being vacant, Pope Paul III of the House of Farnese let himself be convinced that his son Pier Luigi, an expert captain and faithful to him, could be the most suitable to hold it. In the consistory of 31 January 1537 the Pontiff perfected the appointment and the next day, in St. Peter's Basilica, he entrusted Pier Luigi with the sword and the banner of Captain of the Church. Farnese immediately began a journey through the territories of the Papal States, easily bending every resistance and reaching Piacenza (Emilia-Romagna) triumphantly. It was during this trip that the alleged scandal took place. The full account by Varchi:

Cosimo Gheri died in that year, on 24 September, supposedly of pain due to the shock.

Reaction 
The contemporaries have left many stories of Pier Luigi Farnese's unbridled sexuality and his homosexual tendencies, but the so-called rape of Fano had an international echo, being also instrumentalized, due to its connection with the Pope's family, in religious controversies between Catholics and Protestants. Pier Luigi Farnese's sexuality became target of frequent satires ("pasquinate") and the poet Niccolò Franco of Benevento (1515 – 1570) invented the verb "pierluigiare", meaning "to sodomize by force". When Farnese was killed in 1547, a satirical epigram among many so imagined his descent into hell:

References 

Fano
History of the Papal States
House of Farnese
Rape in Italy
Rape of males
Sex scandals
Violence against men in Europe